Eunkyong Choi is an American lawyer and jurist serving as a special trial judge of the United States Tax Court.

Education 
Choi earned a Bachelor of Arts degree in political science from the University of Akron, followed by a Juris Doctor and Master of Laws in taxation from the Washington University School of Law.

Career 
Choi taught ethics and media at Sanford–Brown College and law at the Washington University School of Law. From 2010 to 2014, she was the director of the Nevada Legal Services Low-Income Taxpayer Clinic. From 2014 to 2016, she was supervising attorney of the Washington University Low-Income Taxpayer Clinic. From 2016 to 2021, she managed the New York City Office of the Taxpayer Advocate, an independent office within the New York City Department of Finance. In 2021, she was appointed to serve as a special trial judge of the United States Tax Court.

References 

Living people
American lawyers
Tax lawyers
University of Akron alumni
Washington University School of Law alumni
Washington University in St. Louis faculty
Year of birth missing (living people)